Monika Meyer is the name of:

 Monika Hamann (née Meyer; born 1954), German sprinter
 Monika Meyer (footballer) (born 1972), German footballer